It's a Boy may refer to:

 A phrase based on sex assignment
 It's a Boy!, a 1930 British stage show co-produced by and starring Leslie Henson
 It's a Boy (film), a 1933 British film starring Leslie Henson and directed by Tim Whelan
 "It's a Boy" (song), by Slick Rick, 1991
 "It's a Boy", a song by the Who from Tommy, 1969
 It's a Boy, an upcoming mixtape by J. Cole
 "It's a Boy!" (Roseanne), a 1993 television episode

See also
 It's a Girl (disambiguation)